The St. Michael School is a secondary school in Barbados. It stands on Martindales Road in the parish of Saint Michael, Barbados. The school has over 800 pupils.

Some of the school's notable alumni include the late Dame Nita Barrow, who was the first female (Right Excellent Errol Barrow's sister) governor general of Barbados, and parliamentarian Elizabeth Thompson. The school's headmistress is Mrs. Tanya Harding and the deputy is Mrs Wood.

The school's motto is "Nisi Auxilio Dei Nihil," Latin for "Nothing Without Help From God".

History and achievements
The school was founded by the St. Michael's Vestry and officially opened on 7 May 1928. It was originally a girls' school. In 1979 the first class of boys were admitted to the school

In 2007, a two-year renovation programme came to an end.

In 2007, a student won a gold medal at the CARIFTA Games.

In 2008, the school became the only one on the island to place three students in one sitting to two campuses of the United World Colleges (the UWC Movement). Two students went to the United World College Costa Rica (Santa Ana, Costa Rica) and one to the United World College-USA (Montezuma, USA). It was the largest placement by a single secondary school in Barbados. However, in 2009, the school did not place any of its students into the UWC Movement. The school has a sixth form.

School structure
The St. Michael School is divided into four competitive houses, named after queens: Boadicea (blue), Victoria (red), Anne (yellow) and Elizabeth (purple).

Discipline
The school has a prefect system, under which students help with disciplinary and school matters, run by a head boy and head girl with their  deputies, and five senior prefects. It is considered a well organized school and run by Dr. Y. Mayer’s, the head of the school. In the past years it has accomplished much, notably the installment of bleachers and water systems. It has also led the charge against unhealthy habits and has been commended for its revolutionary initiative.

Notable alumni
 Dame Nita Barrow -  former governor general
 Jason Holder - Captain of the West Indies ODI Team 
 Grace Hackett, Ph.D -Mezzo Soprano
 Ezra Moseley, Former Barbados Cricket Star

References

Schools in Barbados
Educational institutions established in 1928
1928 establishments in the British Empire